Federico Ruzza (born 4 August 1994) is an Italian professional rugby union player who primarily plays lock for Benetton of the United Rugby Championship.

Professional career 
Under contract with Viadana, for 2014–15 Pro12 season, Ruzza named as Permit Player for Zebre in Pro 14 and he played for Zebre from 2015 to 2017. 

In 2014, Ruzza was named in the Italy Under 20 and Italy Sevens squads. In 2015 he was also named in the Emerging Italy squad for the 2015 World Rugby Tbilisi Cup.
Ruzza was part of the Italian squad for the 2017 Six Nations Championshiphaving made his test debut against Scotland during the 2017 Six Nations Championship.
On 18 August 2019, he was named in the final 31-man squad for the 2019 Rugby World Cup.

References

External links 

1994 births
Living people
Italian rugby union players
Italy international rugby union players
Rugby union locks
Rugby Viadana players
Zebre Parma players
Benetton Rugby players